Persatuan Sepakbola Bengkulu (simply known as PS Bengkulu) is an Indonesian football club based in Bengkulu, Bengkulu Province. They currently compete in the Liga 3.

Honours
 Liga 3 Bengkulu
 Third-place: 2021

Seasons

Era Galatama Cup
{|class="wikitable"
|-bgcolor="#efefef"
! Season
! Division
! Position
!Notes
|-
|style="background:#FFFF00;"|1985
|style="background:#FFFF00;align=right" |Eastern Group Perserikatan
|style="background:#FFFF00;align=right" |6
|
|-
|style="background:#FFFF00;"|1986–87
|style="background:#FFFF00;align=right" |Perserikatan Premier Division
|style="background:#FFFF00;align=right" |
|
|-
|style="background:#FFFF00;"|1987–88
|style="background:#FFFF00;align=right" |Premier Division of Perserikatan
|style="background:#FFFF00;align=right" |
|
|-
|style="background:#FFFF00;"|1988–89
|style="background:#FFFF00;align=right" |Premier Division of Perserikatan
|style="background:#FFFF00;align=right" |
|
|-
|style="background:#FFFF00;"|1990
|style="background:#FFFF00;align=right" |Perserikatan
|style="background:#FFFF00;align=right" |
|Relegated 
|-
|style="background:#808080;"|1991–92
|style="background:#808080;align=right" |West Region First Division
|style="background:#808080;align=right" |1
|Winner 
|-
|style="background:#FFFF00;"|1992–93
|style="background:#FFFF00;align=right" |Premier Division of Perserikatan
|style="background:#FFFF00;align=right" |
|
|-
|style="background:#FFFF00;"|1993–94
|style="background:#FFFF00;align=right" |Premier Division of Perserikatan
|style="background:#FFFF00;align=right" |
|
|}

Era Premier Division
{|class="wikitable"
|-bgcolor="#efefef"
! Season
! Division
! Position
!Notes
|-
|style="background:#FFFF00;"|1994–95
|style="background:#FFFF00;align=right" |West Region Premier Division
|style="background:#FFFF00;align=right" |16
|Relegated
|-
|style="background:#808080;"|1995–96
|style="background:#808080;align=right" |Division One
|style="background:#808080;align=right" |
|
|-
|style="background:#808080;"|1996–97
|style="background:#808080;align=right" |Division One
|style="background:#808080;align=right" |
|
|-
|1997–98
|colspan="2" rowspan=5|Unknown

|1
|-
|1998–99
| 
|-
|1999–2000
|
|-
|2001
|
|-
|2002
|
|-
|style="background:#FF7F00;"|2003
|style="background:#FF7F00;align=right" |Division Two
|style="background:#FF7F00;align=right" |Round 1
|
|-
|style="background:#FF7F00;"|2004
|style="background:#FF7F00;align=right" |Division Two
|style="background:#FF7F00;align=right" |Round 1
|
|-
|style="background:#FF7F00;"|2005
|style="background:#FF7F00;align=right" |Division Two
|style="background:#FF7F00;align=right" |Round 1
|
|-
|style="background:#FF7F00;"|2006
|style="background:#FF7F00;align=right" |Division Two
|style="background:#FF7F00;align=right" |Round 1
|
|-
|style="background:#FF7F00;"|2007
|style="background:#FF7F00;align=right" |Division Two
|style="background:#FF7F00;align=right" |
|Withdrew
|}
1 not finish season (was stopped on 25 May 1998)

Era Liga Indonesia
{|class="wikitable"
|-bgcolor="#efefef"
! Season
! Division
! Position
!Notes
|-
|style="background:#CECE1B;"|2008–09
|style="background:#CECE1B;align=right" |Second Division  
|style="background:#CECE1B;align=right" |
|promoted2
|-
|style="background:#FF7F00;"|2009–10
|style="background:#FF7F00;align=right" |First Division
|style="background:#FF7F00;align=right" |6th
|promoted
|-
|style="background:#808080;"|2010–11
|style="background:#808080;align=right" |Premier Division
|style="background:#808080;align=right" |
|-
|style="background:#808080;"|2013
|style="background:#808080;align=right" |Premier Division
|style="background:#808080;align=right" |
|-
|style="background:#808080;"|2014
|style="background:#808080;align=right" |Premier Division
|style="background:#808080;align=right" |
|-
|style="background:#808080;"|2017
|style="background:#808080;align=right" |Premier Division
|style="background:#808080;align=right" |
|
|-
|style="background:#FFFF00;"|2018
|style="background:#FFFF00;align=right" |Liga 3
|style="background:#FFFF00;align=right" |
|Not participating
|-
|style="background:#FFFF00;"|2019
|style="background:#FFFF00;align=right" |Liga 3
|style="background:#FFFF00;align=right" |
|Not participating
|-
|style="background:#FFFF00;"|2020
|style="background:#FFFF00;align=right" |Liga 3
|style="background:#FFFF00;align=right" |
|Cancelled due to the COVID-19 pandemic
|-
|style="background:#FFFF00;"|2021–22
|style="background:#FFFF00;align=right" |Liga 3
|style="background:#FFFF00;align=right" |3rd (Bengkulu zone)
|
|}
2 Fourth level is Division Two (after ISL, Premier Division, Division One) since 2008

References

External links
 

Bengkulu (city)
Football clubs in Bengkulu
Football clubs in Indonesia
Association football clubs established in 1970
1970 establishments in Indonesia